The 1991 Badminton Asian Cup was the first edition of Badminton Asian Cup. It was held in Istora Senayan indoor stadium, Jakarta, Indonesia from 18 to 22 December with total prize money of US$100,000. The main sponsor of this tournament was Cathay Pacific. Malaysian team won titles in Men's singles and doubles event, while South Korea won Women's doubles and Mixed doubles disciplines. Chinese Tang won the Women's singles title.

Medalists

Results

Semifinals

Finals

Medal table

References 

Badminton tournaments in Asia
1991 in badminton
1991 in Indonesian sport
International sports competitions hosted by Indonesia